Roosterville is an unincorporated community in Heard County, in the U.S. state of Georgia.

History
Roosterville was founded in 1905, and according to tradition, was named for the frequent crowing of roosters on local farms.

References

Unincorporated communities in Heard County, Georgia
Unincorporated communities in Georgia (U.S. state)